Bear Pond is a lake located northeast of Stillwater, New York. The outflow creek flows into Middle Branch Oswegatchie River. Fish species present in the lake are brown bullhead, and brook trout. Access via trail off Raven Lake Road on the south shore. No motors are allowed on Bear Pond.

References

External links
https://newyork.hometownlocator.com/maps/feature-map,ftc,1,fid,943300,n,bear%20pond.cfm

Lakes of Herkimer County, New York
Lakes of New York (state)